Taylors Island Wildlife Management Area is a Wildlife Management Area near the community of Taylors Island on the Eastern Shore of the state of Maryland, USA.

External links
 Taylors Island Wildlife Management Area

Wildlife management areas of Maryland
Protected areas of Dorchester County, Maryland
Taylors Island, Maryland